Railways:
0 km

Highways:
total:
2590 km
paved:
1735 km
unpaved:
855 km (1999)

Ports and harbours:
Mataura, Papeete, Rikitea, Uturoa

Merchant marine:
total:
10 ships ( or over) totaling / 
ships by type:
cargo ship 3, passenger ship 2, passenger/cargo 3, refrigerated cargo 1, roll-on/roll-off ship 1 (2003 est.)

Airports:
49 (2003 est.)

Airports - with paved runways:
total:
37
over 3,047 m:
2
1,524 to 2,437 m:
5
914 to 1,523 m:
23
under 914 m:
3 (2004 est.)

Airports - with unpaved runways:
total:
13
914 to 1,523 m:
5
under 914 m:
8 (2004 est.)

Heliports
1 (2003 est.)

See also 
 French Polynesia
 List of airports in French Polynesia

External links